Topologically Integrated Geographic Encoding and Referencing, or TIGER, or TIGER/Line is a format used by the United States Census Bureau to describe land attributes such as roads, buildings, rivers, and lakes, as well as areas such as census tracts.  TIGER was developed to support and improve the Bureau's process of taking the Decennial Census.

The TIGER files do not contain the census demographic data, but merely the geospatial/map data. GIS can be used to merge census demographics or other data sources with the TIGER files to create maps and conduct analysis. TIGER data is available without cost because U.S. Government publications are required to be released into the public domain.

Coverage
The TIGER/Line shapefile data includes complete coverage of the contiguous United States, Alaska, Hawaii, Puerto Rico, the U.S. Virgin Islands, American Samoa, Guam, the Commonwealth of the Northern Mariana Islands, and the Midway Islands.

TIGER includes both land features such as roads, rivers, and lakes, as well as areas such as counties, census tracts, and census blocks.  Some of the geographic areas represented in TIGER are political areas, including state and federally recognized tribal lands, cities, counties, congressional districts, and school districts.  Others are statistical areas, including Metropolitan Statistical Areas (MSA), census tracts, census block groups, and census blocks. ZIP Code Tabulation Areas (ZCTA) are quasi-statistical areas which attempt to approximate, but do not exactly match, the delivery areas of USPS ZIP codes.  ZIP codes are not truly areas, but rather a group of deliverable addresses. Some or all of an existing ZIP code's addresses may be reassigned to a new ZIP if there is sufficient growth within a given postal ZIP Code. As many as 3% of ZIP codes undergo change each quarter. Thus, the 5-digit ZCTAs are of limited value in areas of growth or change.

ZIP codes are based on postal delivery routes and may not correspond to municipalities.

Future
TIGER data published through February 2007 (2006 Second Edition) were in a custom text-based format formally known as TIGER/Line files. In 2008, data in shapefile format was published.  The Census Bureau has made the data available through WMS servers. The data forms a base for OpenStreetMap in the US, and also was used for the initial import of US map data into the Waze navigation system.

References

External links

 TIGERweb Mapping Service

GIS file formats
United States Census Bureau geography